Ras GTPase-activating protein-binding protein 2 is an enzyme that in humans is encoded by the G3BP2 gene.

Interactions 

G3BP2 has been shown to interact with IκBα.

References

Further reading